Icosane (alternative spelling eicosane) is an alkane with the chemical formula C20H42. It has 366,319 constitutional isomers.

Icosane has little use in the petrochemical industry, as its high flash point makes it an inefficient fuel. n-Icosane (the straight-chain structural isomer of icosane) is the shortest compound found in paraffin waxes used to form candles.

Icosane's size, state or chemical inactivity does not exclude it from the traits its smaller alkane counterparts have. It is a colorless, non-polar molecule, nearly unreactive except when it burns. It is less dense than and insoluble in water. Its non-polar trait means it can only perform weak intermolecular bonding (hydrophobic/van der Waals forces).

Icosane's phase transition at a moderate temperature makes it a candidate phase change material, or PCM which can be used to store thermal energy and control temperature. 

It can be detected in the body odor of persons suffering from Parkinson's disease.

Naming
IUPAC currently recommends icosane, whereas Chemical Abstracts Service and Beilstein use eicosane.

See also 

 Perillaldehyde

References

External links
 Icosane at Dr. Duke's Phytochemical and Ethnobotanical Databases

Alkanes